Slavia was a Norwegian black metal band formed in 1997 by Jonas Raskolnikov Christiansen from Kongsberg in 1994 under the name of Dreygjarnir. They changed their name to Slavia in 1997. The band was based in Bergen later when Christiansen moved there for university studies, and featured members from the bands like Taake, Deathcult, Disiplin, Enslaved and Black Flame. 

Christiansen died of colon cancer that had spread to his liver, lungs and throat in December 2017. With him being the only official recording and composing band member (all others were live and session musicians only), the band's existence ceased with his death.

Members
Jonas Raskolnikov Christiansen - vocals
Hoest - bass
Thurzur - guitar
Aindiachai - guitar
m:A Fog - drums
Mr. Roy Kronheim - bass

Discography
Spectral Fascination (demo) (1998)
Collective Trash (demo) (1999)
Not of This World (demo) (1999)Gloria in Excelsis Sathan (demo) (2001) released by Drakkar Productions. Limited to 666 handnumbered copies.Collective Black Trash (demo) (2002)Promo 2002	(demo) (2002)Norwegian Black Terror Assault (7-inch EP) (2003) released by Drakkar Productions. Limited to 500 copies.Promofuck 2003 (demo) (2003)C.O.D. (demo) (2004)Styrke og Visjon (demo) (2006)Strength and Vision (CD) (2007) released by Drakkar Productions. Limited to 1000 copies.Strength and Vision (Digipack) (2008) new lay-out + 7 bonus live-tracks from Hole in the Sky - Festival 2007. Released by Drakkar Productions. Limited to 2000 copies.Strength and Vision (12-inch LP) (2008) new lay-out, splatter vinyl, including an A3-poster. Released by Drakkar Productions. Limited to 500 handnumbered copies.Integrity and Victory (CDR Promo) (2011) Released by Anti Christiansen Media and No Pride In Life Records. Limited to 79 copies.Integrity and Victory (Jewelcase CD) (2011) Released by Drakkar Productions.Integrity and Victory'' (12-inch LP) (2011) Released by Drakkar productions.

References

External links
Official website
Official MySpace profile
Slavia at Misantrof Antirecords

Norwegian black metal musical groups
Musical groups established in 1997
1997 establishments in Norway
Musical groups from Kongsberg
Musical groups from Bergen